Johannes Andreas Schmitz (1621, Soest, Nordrhein-Westfalen – 2 October 1652, Harderwijk) was a German physician and the third rector of the University of Harderwijk.

Life
Schmitz studied medicine in Groningen (1639), Leiden (1643), and Angers. He served as personal physician to Frederick William I, Elector of Brandenburg, and as city physician in Harderwijk (Reip. Harderv. Medicus ordinarius). He became Professor of Medicine (1648) and rector (1650) of the University of Harderwijk. He married Gertrud Kumpsthoff and had a son Johann Dietrich Schmitz (1648/1649-1692), who became mayor of Cleves, and a daughter Sophia (c. 1644-1671).

Works
Schmitz is known for his posthumous work Medicinae practicae compendium (Harderwijk 1653, Copenhagen 1659, Paris 1666, Utrecht 1682, Leiden 1688). Georgius Hornius' preface to this work mentions the deceased author's never-realized plan to publish a botanical work, Plantarum Velavicarum Historia.

References
 Abraham Jacob van der Aa, Biographisch woordenboek der Nederlanden, vol. 17 (Haarlem 1874), p. 369
 A. P. Fokker, "Verslag van den Hoofsbestuurder-Bibliothecaris aan de commissie tot hen nazien der Bibliotheek," Weekblad van het nederlandsch tijdschrift voor geneseeskunde, no. 23 (June 9, 1900), in Nederlands tijdschrift voor geneeskunde 44 (1900), pp. 1068 f.

Further reading
 Hermannus Bouman, Geschiedenis van de voormalige geldersche hoogeschool en hare hoogleeraren (Utrecht 1844), part 1, pp. 184, 316, 319, 327, 433; part 2, pp. 607, 651

1621 births
1652 deaths
17th-century Dutch physicians
People from Soest, Netherlands
Leiden University alumni
University of Groningen alumni
Academic staff of the University of Harderwijk